Cattleya intermedia, the intermediate cattleya, is a bifoliate Cattleya species of orchid. The diploid chromosome number of C. intermedia has been determined as 2n = 40.

References

External links

intermedia
intermedia
Plants described in 1828